This is a list of official trips made by Bujar Nishani as the 6th President of Albania of the Republic of Albania.

State visits 

The following international trips were made by President Bujar Nishani:

See also 
 Bujar Nishani
 President of Albania
 Politics of Albania

References

External links 
 Official Website

State visits by Albanian leaders
Albania diplomacy-related lists
Foreign relations of Albania
Diplomatic visits by heads of state